Monsignor Olivier Maurault, CMG, FRSC (1 January 1886 – 14 August 1968) was a Canadian historian, priest of the Society of the Priests of Saint Sulpice, and academic administrator. He was Rector of the Université de Montréal from 1934 to 1955.

He was President of the Royal Society of Canada in 1943–1944.

References 

 https://www.patrimoine-culturel.gouv.qc.ca/rpcq/detail.do?methode=consulter&id=8534&type=pge
 https://dx.doi.org/10.7202/1012942ar

1886 births
1968 deaths
Université de Montréal
Sulpicians
Fellows of the Royal Society of Canada
20th-century Canadian historians
Canadian historians of religion
Canadian art historians
Canadian Companions of the Order of St Michael and St George
Canadian academic administrators
Canadian librarians
20th-century Canadian Roman Catholic priests